is a 1951 Japanese drama and shomin-geki film directed by Mikio Naruse and starring Setsuko Hara. It is based on the final and unfinished novel by Fumiko Hayashi, and was the first in a series of adaptations of her work by the director.

Plot
Michiyo has moved from Tokyo to settle down in Osaka with her salaryman husband, whom she married against her parents' wishes. A few years later into the marriage, her husband treats her carelessly, and she is slowly worn down by domestic drudgery. The situation worsens when her pretty niece, fleeing from her parents' plans for an arranged marriage, comes to stay and the husband responds to her flirtatious behaviour. Dissatisfied with his efforts to improve their household life, she leaves with her niece for Tokyo to stay with her family for a time, but finally returns, resigning to marital conventions.

Cast
 Ken Uehara as Hatsunosuke Okamoto
 Setsuko Hara as Michiyo Okamoto
 Yukiko Shimazaki as Satoko Okamoto
 Yōko Sugi as Mitsuko Murata, Michiyo's sister-in-law
 Akiko Kazami as Seiko Tomiyasu
 Haruko Sugimura as Matsu Murata, Michiyo's mother
 Ranko Hanai as Koyoshi Dohya
 Hiroshi Nihon'yanagi as Kazuo Takenaka
 Keiju Kobayashi as Shinzo Murata, Michiyo's brother
 Akira Oizumi as Yoshitaro Taniguchi
 Ichiro Shimizu as Hatsunosuke's colleague
 Haruo Tanaka as Jihei Maruyama
 Sō Yamamura as Ryuichiro Okamoto
 Chieko Nakakita as Keiko Yamakita

Production
Repast was the first of a series of six films directed by Naruse based on works by Fumiko Hayashi, "a novelist whose pessimistic outlook matched his own" (Alexander Jacoby). It also marked a successful return for Naruse, whose films of the preceding 15 years were regarded as lesser works by critics. According to screenwriter Toshirō Ide, he and his co-writer Sumie Tanaka had wanted to finish the story with the couple's divorce, but this was vetoed by the studio in favour of a conclusion with, as contemporary critic Takao Toda put it, "mass appeal".

Awards
Blue Ribbon Award for Best Film, Best Actress (Setsuko Hara), Best Supporting Actress (Haruko Sugimura) and Best Screenplay (Sumie Tanaka)
Mainichi Film Concours for Best Film, Best Actress (Setsuko Hara), Best Director (Mikio Naruse), Best Cinematography (Masao Tamai) and Best Sound Recording (Masao Fujiyoshi)

References

External links

 
 
 

1951 films
1951 drama films
Japanese drama films
1950s Japanese-language films
Japanese black-and-white films
Films based on Japanese novels
Films based on works by Fumiko Hayashi
Films directed by Mikio Naruse
Toho films
Films produced by Sanezumi Fujimoto
Films scored by Fumio Hayasaka
1950s Japanese films